Marilyn Lane is an American politician and business woman from Michigan. Lane is a former Democratic member of Michigan House of Representatives from District 31.

Early life 
On February 10, 1959, Lane was born Detroit, Michigan. Lane's father was Nino Messana, an entrepreneur. Lane's mother was Louise Messana, an office manager.

Education 
Lane attended Macomb Community College in Macomb County, Michigan.

Career 
In 1985, Lane became the President of Lane Development, until 2006.

In 2003, Lane became the mayor of Fraser, Michigan, until 2007.

In 2008, Lane became the Vice chairwoman of Macomb County Charter Commission.

Lane was a Business Development Representative and Chairperson of Alternative Energy Division of Roncelli Inc.

On November 2, 2010, Lane won the election and became a Democratic member of Michigan House of Representatives for District 31. Lane defeated Dan Tollis, James Miller, and Dan Elles with  50.92% of the votes. On November 6, 2012, as an incumbent, Lane won the election and continued serving District 31.Lane defeated Lynn Evans and James Miller with 
61.74% of the votes. On November 4, 2014, as an incumbent, Lane won the election and continued serving District 31. Lane defeated Phil Rode with 61.07% of the votes.

In 2016, due to term limits, Lane did not seek for election. The seat for District 31 was succeeded by William Sowerby.

In 2013, Lane served on a Michigan House Democrat task force created to help better address the needs of Michigan veterans. In October 2017, she announced plans to run for the Michigan Senate in the 9th district.

Electoral history

Personal life 
Lane's husband is James. They have a child. Lane and her family live in Fraser, Michigan.

See also 
 2010 Michigan House of Representatives election
 2012 Michigan House of Representatives election
 2014 Michigan House of Representatives election

References

External links
 
Legislative website

Living people
Democratic Party members of the Michigan House of Representatives
1959 births
Women state legislators in Michigan
21st-century American politicians
21st-century American women politicians
People from Fraser, Michigan